Mustis is the pseudonym of Øyvind Johan Mustaparta (born 10 September 1979), a Norwegian keyboardist best known for his work in the symphonic black metal band Dimmu Borgir, as well as the black/thrash metal band Susperia.

Biography 
Mustis was briefly an official member of Susperia (at the time named Seven Sins) from 1999 to mid-2000. He played keyboards on a demo EP the band released called Illusions of Evil (2000), shortly after which he left the band to focus on Dimmu Borgir.

Mustis made his first appearance on a Dimmu Borgir release when he played keyboards on live tracks featured in the compilation album Godless Savage Garden (1998), and he has contributed to the further progression of their ambient, atmospherical, symphonic sound. This can be heard in songs such as "Progenies of the Great Apocalypse", which he composed, from the album Death Cult Armageddon (2003). His other studio work with Dimmu Borgir includes Spiritual Black Dimensions (1999), Puritanical Euphoric Misanthropia (2001), the re-release of Stormblåst (2005) and In Sorte Diaboli (2007).  

After departing the band in 2009, he issued a statement in which he implied that he was being kept out of the proper registration for music he was writing.  Due to this, according to his statement, he was fired by text message and he will be allowing "the resolution come from the lawyers instead of dealing with more dishonesty and lies on a one-on-one personal level."

In 2010, Mustis made a return to Susperia, providing keyboards and orchestral arrangements on the album We Are The Ones (2011). The lead single, "Nothing Remains", was entered into 2011's Eurovision Song Contest to represent Norway, but it was knocked out in the semi-final of the qualifying Melodi Grand Prix.

Mustis' surname Mustaparta comes from Finnish language. Literally translated, it means "black beard".

Discography

With Susperia 
Illusions of Evil (Demo) – (2000)
Nothing Remains (Single) – NRK/MGP (2011)
We Are the Ones – SMG Records (2011)

With Dimmu Borgir 
Spiritual Black Dimensions – Nuclear Blast (1999) (reissued in 2004)
Puritanical Euphoric Misanthropia – Nuclear Blast (2001)
Alive in Torment (live EP) – Nuclear Blast (2001)
World Misanthropy (live EP) – Nuclear Blast (2002)
Death Cult Armageddon – Nuclear Blast (2003)
Vredesbyrd (single) – Nuclear Blast (2004)
The Sacrilegious Scorn (single) – Nuclear Blast (2007)
In Sorte Diaboli Sampler (single) – Nuclear Blast (2007)
The Serpentine Offering (single) – Nuclear Blast (2007)
In Sorte Diaboli – Nuclear Blast (2007)

References 

1979 births
Living people
Musicians from Bærum
Dimmu Borgir members
Heavy metal keyboardists
Norwegian atheists
Norwegian black metal musicians
Norwegian people of Kven descent
Norwegian rock keyboardists
Place of birth missing (living people)
Susperia members